Toshi Yano is an American rock musician, playing bass and keyboard. He was a founding member of the Washington, D.C., hardcore band Battery, the New York hardcore band Violent Bullshit, and of Kapow!, a Brooklyn-based band. Yano also worked as a recording and mixing engineer.

Yano was a touring member of The Fiery Furnaces from 2003–2005, playing bass and keyboards on world tours with the band. During that period, Yano was also a temporary bass player for Franz Ferdinand.

Kapow! was a 7-piece band, fronted by Yano, which included Tris McCall on keyboards, and  The Negatones frontmen Jay and Justin Braun. In 2005, the New York Times wrote that Kapow! was "old-fashioned, but frequently irresistible", featuring the "vocal harmonies and garage-rock riffs" characteristic of late-1960s pop music. They released a three-song demo recording which included "In Regards to the Children," "Girl," and "Make You Mine." Kapow! remained active into 2008.

External links 
 Toshi Yano at Discogs
 Kapow! official site on MySpace (archived 2009)

References 

Year of birth missing (living people)
Living people
American bass guitarists
American musicians of Japanese descent
Battery (hardcore punk band) members